Star Channel is a Japanese group of premium television channels operated by Star Channel, Inc.. Star Channel mainly provides films and television series made outside Japan, on 3 high-definition channels, available on satellite, cable and IPTV platforms. As of 2021, the channel is currently owned by Tohokushinsha Film.

Corporate

Star Channel was founded as a private company in 1986. Previously, each 25% of the company's stake were owned by Itochu, 21st Century Fox (previously as the original News Corporation), Sony Pictures and Tohokushinsha Film, but as of 2018, 21st Century Fox sold its share in the company to Tohokushinsha. Sony Pictures later divested the company in 2019.

Channels
 Star Channel 1 (formerly Star Channel and Star Channel Hi-Vision): The main channel launched on 1 July 1986. Its HD simulcast channel was separately branded as Star Channel Hi-Vision, but the branding was removed with the 1 October 2011 rebrand of channels.
 Star Channel 2 (formerly Star Channel Plus until 30 September 2011)
 Star Channel 3 (formerly Star Channel Classic until 30 September 2011)

References

External links
  
 Corporate information in English

Television stations in Japan
Television channels and stations established in 1986
Itochu
1986 establishments in Japan
Former subsidiaries of The Walt Disney Company